The canton of Commercy is an administrative division of the Meuse department, northeastern France. Its borders were modified at the French canton reorganisation which came into effect in March 2015. Its seat is in Commercy.

It consists of the following communes:
 
Boncourt-sur-Meuse
Chonville-Malaumont
Commercy
Euville
Frémeréville-sous-les-Côtes
Girauvoisin
Grimaucourt-près-Sampigny
Geville
Lérouville
Mécrin
Pont-sur-Meuse
Saint-Julien-sous-les-Côtes
Vadonville
Vignot

References

Cantons of Meuse (department)